Moskit (Russian for mosquito) can refer to the following Russian military weapons:

 P-270 Moskit cruise missile
 Project 205 Moskit missile boat